The Director-General of Justice and Home Affairs heads the Directorate-General for Justice and Home Affairs. The current Director-General is Rafael Fernández-Pita y González.

References

Politics of the European Union
Council of the European Union
Political offices of the European Union